Limburg-Styrum-Borkelö was a noble family of the Netherlands which originated in Germany. It was a line of the House of Limburg-Styrum and was partitioned from Limburg-Styrum-Bronchhorst-Borkelö in 1766. The family reigned over their territories until the mediatization of 1806.

Counts of Limburg-Styrum-Borkelö (1766 - 1806)

House of Limburg
Counties of the Holy Roman Empire
House of Limburg-Stirum
States and territories disestablished in 1806
1806 disestablishments
Berkelland